Ash Township may refer to the following townships in the United States:

 Ash Township, Michigan
 Ash Township, Barry County, Missouri